Troy Residential Historic District is a national historic district located at Troy, Montgomery County, North Carolina. The district encompasses five contributing dwellings in a residential section of Troy.  They were built between 1871 and 1940 and includes notable examples of Queen Anne and Classical Revival style architecture.  They are the Joseph Reese Blair House (1893, 1903), Mills-Thompson House (1890, 1930), Wade-Arscott House (1871, 1890s), Bruton-Allen House (1895, 1927), and Thompson Rental House (1940).

It was added to the National Register of Historic Places in 2006.

References

Houses on the National Register of Historic Places in North Carolina
Historic districts on the National Register of Historic Places in North Carolina
Queen Anne architecture in North Carolina
Neoclassical architecture in North Carolina
Houses in Montgomery County, North Carolina
National Register of Historic Places in Montgomery County, North Carolina